Paula Rae Gibson is an English photographer and singer-songwriter.

Music
A track from the album, We Blow It Every Time, was selected as one of the top ten tracks of 2007 by the editors of Time Out.

Film
Gibson was the scriptwriter, actor and composer for the film, What Are You Doing Forever?.

Personal life
Gibson is the widow of film director Brian Gibson.

Publications

Photography
 Diary of a Love Addict. Kehrer, 2005. Edited by Milan Chlumsky and Gibson. .
 I'll Always Walk Away. Kehrer, 2007. .
 You Gather My Darkness Like Snow Watch It Melt. Babel, 2011.
 Rae: a Pictorial Love Song. Eyemazing, 2016. . 14th Julia Margaret Cameron Awards winner in Women seen by Women.

Novella
Hanging onto a Thread to Believe in Rare Things. Indigo Dreams, 2012. . A novella on grief.

Discography
 No More Tiptoes (33 Jazz, 2007)
 Maybe Too Nude (Babel, 2008) – with Will Gregory and drummer Martyn Barker
 You Gather My Darkness Like Snow Watch It Melt (Babel, 2009) – with pianist Ivo Neame and Jim Hart
 The Pleasure of Ruin (Babel, 2013) by Rae Forest Project – with Mike Flynn, Sophie Alloway and Tom Pilling
 Emotion Machine (Slowfoot, 2019) – with Kit Downes
 The Roles We Play to Disappear (Octoberhouse, 2022) – with Alex Bonney and Matthew Bourne, Rob Luft
 I Found You Eating Colours (Unvaeled, 2023)

Filmography
 What Are You Doing Forever? (Wiggy Woo, 2006)

References

External links
 
 

English women photographers
People from Greenwich
Living people
Year of birth missing (living people)